Bo Jansson (born 20 April 1937) is a Swedish modern pentathlete who competed at the 1964 and 1972 Summer Olympics. In 1964 he finished eighth individually and fourth with the team, and in 1972 he placed 24th and fifth, respectively.

References

External links
 

1937 births
Living people
Swedish male modern pentathletes
Olympic modern pentathletes of Sweden
Modern pentathletes at the 1964 Summer Olympics
Modern pentathletes at the 1972 Summer Olympics
Sportspeople from Uppsala
20th-century Swedish people
21st-century Swedish people